Vexillum croceorbis is a species of sea snail, a marine gastropod mollusk, in the family Costellariidae, the ribbed miters.

Distribution
This species occurs in Philippines Exclusive Economic Zone.

References

croceorbis
Gastropods described in 2013